Lachit Barphukan was an Ahom commander, known for his leadership in the Battle of Saraighat that thwarted an invasion by Mughal forces under the command of Ramsingh I.

Biography 
Lachit was born to Momai Tamuli, a commoner who rose to the ranks of Borbarua. A few Buranjis briefly describe Lachit's victory over the Mughal naval fleet, led by Ram Singh, in the Battle of Saraighat. He died soon and was buried at Teok in Jorhat in a maidam. King Chakradhwaj Singha selected Lachit to command the expedition against the Mughals and appointed him as the Barphukan in 1667. Prior to his appointment to Borphukanship, he also had held the offices of Baruas and Phukans.

Lachit was a disciple of Vaishnava preacher Ramgopal.

Legacy 

Beginning in the early twentieth century, a few localities in Upper Assam started to commemorate November 24 as Lachit Dibox (trans. Lachit Day) as a medium of protest against the pro-migrant policies of the colonial government. The contemporaneous burgeoning of public interest in history meant that the legend of Barphukan had "attained an iconic status" by the first quarter of the century; yet, Lachit was one of the many quasi-historical icons who were appropriated by Assamese elites towards different politico-cultural ends and his popularity remained below Joymoti Konwari and others. In 1947, Surya Kumar Bhuyan published Lachit's biography against the backdrop of Ahom conflicts with the Mughal Empire; not only did the work grant a veneer of "academic respectability" to the legend but also "mythologized" his exploits in the Assamese psyche. 

In postcolonial Assam, cultural heroes like Lachit were largely displaced by anti-colonial activists in Nehruvian nation-building; Jayeeta Sharma notes the legend of Lachit to have "retired into the domain of knowledge, away from activism." However, the legend survived in the backwaters of Assamese sub-nationalism, with the United Liberation Front of Asom (ULFA) — a secessionist organization seeking the creation of an independent and sovereign Assam — extensively using Lachit's imagery for propaganda. Lachit's memory would be significantly appropriated within a governmental framework only under the governorship of Srinivas Kumar Sinha.

With time, Lachit has been appropriated within a Hindu Nationalist grammar as an Indian military hero; Sharma, writing as of 2004, noted that it was no more the ULFA but the Government of Assam that tried the most to bring him into prominence. BJP's rise in Assam has established Lachit as a Hindu defender against Muslim aggression; historians reject such characterizations and accuse the party of rerouting nativist sentiments to communal faultlines. Not only was Lachit a Tai whose fellow commanders included Muslims but also the Mughal forces were led by a Rajput. In January 2023 All Tai Ahom Students Union criticized Himanta Biswa Sarma against distortion of Ahom history and said Lachit was a "Assamese Hero" and not a "Hindu Hero" and "Indian hero" at first place" In fact, Assamese historians further claimed that, Lachit Borphukan and his soldiers were never Hindus at first place and rather he and his soldiers were the followers of their native tribal Tai Ahom Religion.

Notes

References

External links
 

1671 deaths
People of the Ahom kingdom
17th-century births
17th-century Indian people
Ahom kingdom